Adam S. Miller is an American author of religious criticism and interpretation, with an focus on contemporary Latter-day Saint lay theology. Miller is also a professor of philosophy at Collin College in McKinney, Texas, where he directs the college's honors program.

Miller's work offers fresh interpretation on topics such as Christ's atonement, the appropriate relationship of faith and scholarship, and the nature of Latter-day Saint testimony. Miller co-founded Salt Press, a publisher of Mormon studies sold to BYU's Maxwell Institute, and also founded and serves as co-director of the annual colloquia, the Mormon Theology Seminar.

Books 
Authored

Edited

References

External links
 
 Interview by Neal A. Maxwell Institute for Religious Scholarship's Blair Hodges
 KoffordAuthorcastAdamSMiller (audio interview)

American bloggers
American educators
American Latter Day Saint writers
Brigham Young University alumni
Villanova University alumni
Historians of the Latter Day Saint movement
Living people
Mormon bloggers
Mormon studies scholars
Christian writers
American Christian theologians
Philosophy academics
Latter Day Saints from Texas
21st-century American non-fiction writers
Year of birth missing (living people)
Mormon theologians